The Orange Line is a Bay Area Rapid Transit (BART) line in the San Francisco Bay Area that runs from Berryessa/North San José station to Richmond station. It has 21 stations in San Jose, Milpitas, Fremont, Union City, Hayward, San Leandro, Oakland, Berkeley, El Cerrito, and Richmond. It is the only of the five primary BART services that does not run through the Transbay Tube to San Francisco; however, it shares tracks with the four other primary services in the East Bay.

History 
The Orange Line was the first BART line to open. Initial services between MacArthur and Fremont stations began on September 11, 1972, with full service extending to Richmond beginning on January 29, 1973. 

The line would not see any major changes for another 45 years, until the start of the Silicon Valley BART extension. The first phase of the project extended the line to Warm Springs/South Fremont station in March 2017, the second phase added Berryessa/North San José and Milpitas stations in June 2020.

Route 
The Orange Line runs primarily north-south though the East Bay. It uses the R-Line between Richmond station and just north of MacArthur station, the K-Line between MacArthur and the Oakland Wye, the A-Line between the Wye and Fremont station, and the S-Line between Fremont and Berryessa/North San José station. Most sections are at-grade or elevated; the line runs through tunnels in downtown Berkeley, downtown Oakland, and under Lake Elizabeth.

Stations

References 

Orange Line (BART)
Railway lines opened in 1972
1972 establishments in California